In the 2018–19 season, Partizan NIS Belgrade will compete in the Serbian League, Radivoj Korać Cup, Adriatic League and EuroCup.

Players

Current roster

Players with multiple nationalities
   Amar Gegić
   Stefan Janković
   Marcus Paige
   Alex Renfroe
   Bandja Sy

On loan

Roster changes

In

Out

Pre-season and friendlies

Competitions

Adriatic League

Regular season

Matches

Playoffs 
Semifinals

Basketball League of Serbia

The 2018–19 Basketball League of Serbia is the 13th season of the Serbian highest professional basketball league and the Super League, as the second part of the season, will be held within April to May 2019.

Regular season

Matches

Semifinals

Finals

EuroCup

Regular season

Group C

Matches

Top 16: Group E

Matches

Adriatic Supercup

Radivoj Korać Cup

Individual awards

Adriatic League

MVP of the Round
 Vanja Marinković – Round 10
 Vanja Marinković – Semifinal 2

MVP of the Month
 Marcus Paige – January 2019

Ideal Starting Five
 Jock Landale

Serbian League

Finals MVP

 Alex Renfroe

Radivoj Korać Cup

MVP
 Alex Renfroe

Top Scorer
 Jock Landale

Statistics

ABA League

EuroCup

Radivoj Korać Cup

ABA Super Cup

References

External links
 Official website
 Partizan at ABA League.com

2018-19
2018–19 in Serbian basketball by club
2018–19 ABA League First Division
Partizan